Anna Bitature Mugenyi (née Anna Bitature), is a Ugandan justice of the High Court of Uganda, since May 2016.

Background and education
She was born and educated in Uganda for her elementary schooling. She earned her High School Diploma at Mount Saint Mary's College Namagunga, a prestigious all-girls boarding high school in present-day Mukono District.

She earned a Bachelor of Laws (LLB) degree from Makerere University, the nation's oldest and largest public University. In 1993, she also obtained a Diploma in Legal Practice, from the Law Development Centre, in Kampala, the country's capital city and was admitted to the Uganda Bar, as a practicing lawyer. Later, she earned a Master of Business Administration from the Eastern and Southern African Management Institute.

Career
Justice Bitature's expertise is in commercial law and tax administration. She served as Assistant Commissioner at the headquarters of the Uganda People's Defence Forces (UPDF), based at its headquarters in Mbuya.  She was then hired by the Uganda Revenue Authority (URA), working there as Assistant Commissioner, until she was appointed to the High Court of Uganda, as a judge. She is assigned to the Commercial Division of the High Court.

See also
 Lydia Mugambe
 Elizabeth Kabanda
 Flavia Anglin Senoga

References

External links
 Seven new judges sworn in As of 9 May 2016.
 Photograph of Justice Anna Bitature Mugenyi, at Flickr.com As of 9 May 2016.

Living people
Year of birth missing (living people)
Makerere University alumni
Eastern and Southern African Management Institute alumni
21st-century Ugandan judges
Law Development Centre alumni
Ugandan women judges
People from Western Region, Uganda
Justices of the High Court of Uganda
People educated at Mount Saint Mary's College Namagunga
21st-century women judges